Petra Nosková (born 31 October 1967) is a Czech biathlete. She competed in the women's individual event at the 1992 Winter Olympics.

References

External links
 

1967 births
Living people
Biathletes at the 1992 Winter Olympics
Czech female biathletes
Olympic biathletes of Czechoslovakia
People from Nové Město na Moravě
Sportspeople from the Vysočina Region